Eurosport is a group of pay television networks in Europe and parts of Asia. Owned by Warner Bros. Discovery through its international sports unit, it operates two main channels—Eurosport 1 and Eurosport 2—across most of its territories, and streams on Discovery+, which superseded Eurosport Player.

Originally a joint venture between the European Broadcasting Union and Sky established in 1989, it was briefly shut down in 1991 following complaints by competitor Screensport. It was subsequently acquired by TF1 Group, and later merged with Screensport. For a period, it was a joint venture between TF1, Canal+ Group, and Havas Images. TF1 Group later bought out the other owners' shares. In 2012, Discovery Communications began to take an ownership in Eurosport, eventually leading towards a full buyout in 2015.

Eurosport is the main rightsholder of the Olympic Games in most of Europe, as well as (with some exceptions) the tennis Grand Slam tournaments.

The network of channels is available in 54 countries, in 20 different languages, providing viewers with European and international sporting events. Eurosport had 157 million subscribers in 2019, marking no increase from the previous year. The Eurosport 2 channel had an audience of 87 million viewers in 2019, an increase of one million.

History 

Prior to the creation of Eurosport, the European Broadcasting Union had acquired substantial amounts of sports rights, yet its members were only able to broadcast a fraction of them. This provided the impetus for setting up the Eurosport Consortium, made up of several EBU members, to establish an outlet where these rights could be exploited. Sky Television was chosen as a commercial partner to the EBU project, and the channel launched at 6pm on 5 February 1989. It largely replaced the original Sky Channel (later rebranded Sky One) on European cable systems. Sky Channel refocused to serve only the United Kingdom and Ireland. For a period of time, some of Sky Channel's former pan-European programming was broadcast in the hours before Eurosport's startup, under the brand Sky Europe.

1991 closure
Eurosport was closed down in May 1991 after rival Screensport channel filed a complaint to the European Commission over the corporate structure. The channel was saved later that month when the TF1 Group (formed after the French government privatized the post ORTF-split TF1 5 years prior to the acquisition) stepped in to replace BSkyB as joint-owners. It was able to restart its broadcast after 10 days. Broadcasting hours were restricted to 1pm to 11pm, later 8am until midnight before settling at 7.30am and 1am. Its overnight hours were occupied by shopping channel The Quantum Channel.

Eurosport Player & rebrand 
On 1 March 1993, the cable and satellite channel Screensport merged with Eurosport. Five days later, that channel's transponder space was taken over by RTL II. Eurosport eventually came under a French consortium comprising the TF1 Group, Canal+ Group and Havas Images. In January 2001, TF1 took full ownership of Eurosport.

In May 2007, Yahoo! Europe and Eurosport formed a co-branded website which Eurosport used as its web portal, including an online TV guide, in the UK, Ireland, Spain, Italy and Germany.

In 2008, Eurosport launched an online subscription service, Eurosport Player, that allows internet users to watch both Eurosport and Eurosport 2 live, plus additional coverage not available via broadcast. During the 2009 Australian Open, the internet player offered coverage from five courts.

On 5 April 2011, Eurosport rebranded its channel. The rebrand incorporated six new on-air idents along with a new logo and presentation style both on-air and off-air. The new on-air identity has been designed by Paris-based design company Les Télécréateurs. All localised Eurosport channels and the Eurosport website embraced the new identity.

Analogue closedown
Having been one of the first channels to broadcast on the Astra 1 group of satellites, Eurosport was the last satellite channel in Europe to broadcast in an analogue format. On 30 April 2012, shortly after 03:00 CET, the rest of the remaining analogue channels at 19.2 East ceased transmission. Eurosport's analogue channel finally ceased transmission on 1 May 2012 at 01:30 CET, marking the end of an era in European satellite broadcasting.

Stake and acquisition by Discovery Communications; Warner Bros. Discovery
On 21 December 2012, Discovery Communications purchased a 20 per cent minority interest share in Eurosport from TF1 Group for €170m. Discovery became the majority shareholder in the Eurosport venture with TF1 in January 2014, taking a 51 per cent share of the company. On 22 July 2015 Discovery agreed to acquire TF1's remaining 49 per cent stake in the venture.

On 13 November 2015, Eurosport introduced its new brand identity and changed the name of its main channel to Eurosport 1.

In 2016, Eurosport expanded its deal with The All England Club to show all the Wimbledon matches live in 19 countries, up from three under a previous deal. It was a 3-year deal (2017-2019) that included exclusive TV and digital rights. This expanded their tennis portfolio to show all four Grand Slams. Eurosport signed a new deal in 2019 to broadcast Wimbledon exclusively in 11 countries. , Eurosport broadcasts the Australian Open, French Open (except in France), US Open (except in the UK and Ireland), and Wimbledon.

In February 2017, Discovery launched the channel in India, branded as DSport which was later renamed to Eurosport in 2020. The channel was made available on various platforms in both SD and HD feeds.

On 5 January 2021, Discovery began to phase out Eurosport Player in favour of its new streaming service Discovery+.

On 11 May 2022, Warner Bros. Discovery (new company formed after merger of Discovery with WarnerMedia) announced an agreement to contribute Eurosport's UK operations into a joint venture with BT Group and BT Sport. WBD will serve as managing partner of the joint venture; the two networks will operate separately for an interim period, after which they will combine their operations under a new name. As part of the agreement, WBD also negotiated a deal for BT Group to distribute Discovery+ to its television and BT Sport subscribers.

Channels

Eurosport 1

This is the main channel of Eurosport. A high-definition simulcast version of Eurosport launched on 25 May 2008. The first event covered in HD was the 2008 French Open at Roland Garros. On 13 November 2015 it changed its name to Eurosport 1 HD.

Eurosport 1 feeds
In Europe, Eurosport 1 is generally available in basic cable and satellite television packages. Since 1999, Eurosport 1 provides various opt-out services providing more relevant sporting content specific to language, advertising and commentary needs. Eurosport offers a stand-alone channel which provides a standardised version of the channel (Eurosport International in English). Alongside this, there are also local Eurosport channels in France, United Kingdom, Italy, Germany, Poland, Nordic region, Benelux region and Asia Pacific. These channels offer greater sporting content with local sporting events, while also utilising the existing pan-European feed. The German version of Eurosport is the only one available free-to-air on European digital satellite television.

Eurosport 1 is currently broadcast in 23 languages: English, French, German, Italian, Spanish, Portuguese, Dutch, Swedish, Norwegian, Danish, Finnish, Icelandic, Russian, Polish, Czech, Slovak, Hungarian, Romanian, Bulgarian, Serbian, Greek, Turkish, Cantonese and Croatian.

In Asia-Pacific territories, Eurosport offers a specific channel to the region. Eurosport (Asia-Pacific) launched on 15 November 2009. The service is available in Australia through Foxtel, Optus and TransACT. On 3 November 2014, a HD simulcast launched on Foxtel.

Eurosport 2

A supplementary channel featuring more live sports events, programming and news updates. Eurosport 2 launched on 10 January 2005 and is currently available in 35 countries, broadcasting in 22 different languages.

Eurosport 2 describes itself as "the new generation sports channel", dedicated to team sports, alternative sports, discovery and entertainment including basketball (like the Italian LBA), Twenty20 Cricket, Bundesliga, National Lacrosse League, Arena Football League, surfing, Volleyball Champions League, Australian Rules Football matches from the Australian Football League, Bandy World Championships and more. Eurosport 2 was branded as Eurosport DK in Denmark. On 15 February 2016, this channel was replaced by Eurosport 2.

Eurosport 2 HD, a high-definition version of the channel, is also available.

Eurosport 2 HD Xtra is a German pay-TV channel launched in 2017. Eurosport bought Germany-only rights for Bundesliga, Supermoto and other broadcasting rights. Eurosport 2 has no German-only signal and Eurosport 1 is free-to-air, so the new channel was needed.

Eurosport India 

Eurosport India is the Indian version of the channel launched in February 2017 as DSport. It was made available on major DTH platforms and cable networks across India during the launch. The channel's primary focus would not be cricket, as per the press meet at the launch. The current offering from the channel includes less popular football leagues, cricket premier leagues, wrestling, fighting, golf, motor sports, horse racing, cycling and rugby.  The channel is only available in high-definition format. However, few DTH operators downscale the feed to be presented with the standard-definition bouquet. As of 2018, Eurosport India was available to over 110 million households in India.

Eurosport EPL Romania
Eurosport EPL Romania is a channel owned by Eurosport, which broadcasts the English Premier League in Romania. It acquired the rights from the Premier League to broadcast the 2013–14 Premier League season.

Eurosport Gold
Eurosport Gold Russia is a channel owned by Eurosport which broadcasts the National Hockey League in Russia. It acquired the rights from the NHL to broadcast the 2017–18 NHL season.

Former channels

British Eurosport (1999–2015)
In the UK, British Eurosport launched in 1999, replacing Eurosport International on most platforms, with some schedule variations and local commentary. The launch of British Eurosport and creation of programming specifically for the UK was initially funded by Premium TV, which did not have a stake in the sports channel, but received a share of the revenue. British Eurosport had live studio presentations of major sporting events and tournaments.

On British Eurosport, James Richardson previously hosted the coverage of Serie A football on the Channel from 2002 to 2005 and 2004 UEFA European Football Championship with regular guests, including Alan Curbishley, DJ Spoony, former Chelsea FC players Paul Elliott, Ed de Goey, Ray Wilkins, Roberto Di Matteo & former Chelsea goalkeeper Carlo Cudicini now at LA Galaxy, former England International Luther Blissett and European football journalists Gabriele Marcotti and Xavier Rivoire.

Will Vanders is known for his spirited coverage of K-1 events, and greets the viewer in Japanese, Korean, Chinese, and Thai to introduce the martial arts show, Fight Club, on Monday nights.

For tennis, studio presentation for the Australian Open, French Open, U.S. Open and WTA Tour Championships on British Eurosport is hosted by Annabel Croft with the segment Hawk-Eye presented by former British number 2 Jason Goodall. (Goodall was briefly ranked ahead of Chris Bailey, Nick Brown, Andrew Castle, Nick Fulwood, Mark Petchey, and James Turner, in May 1989).

British Eurosport covers the snooker season, including ranking events not broadcast by BBC Television such as the Shanghai Masters and China Open. Neal Foulds and former world champion Joe Johnson are among the commentators.

Tour de France coverage in 2014 was commentated on by Carlton Kirby (following the departure of David Harmon) with veteran cyclist Sean Kelly as the "technical expert". The duo continued to commentate in 2015 and an additional pre- and post-programme was broadcast, "Lemond on Tour". This was presented by Ashley House with comment and analysis from Eurosport Cycling Ambassador Greg LeMond. Additional interviews were provided by Spanish cycling journalist Laura Meseguer and former pro racing cyclist Juan Antonio Flecha.

David Goldstrom has commentated on ski jumping and ski flying coverage since 1989.

On 10 February 2009, British Eurosport started to broadcast most of its programming in the 16:9 'widescreen' ratio. After the collapse of Setanta Sports, rights for the 2009 season in the USPGA Golf tour reverted to British Eurosport.

On 25 July 2012, British Eurosport HD launched on the Sky, UPC Ireland and Virgin Media platforms, this replaced the pan-European Eurosport HD in the UK and Ireland. British Eurosport 2 HD launched on 3 September 2012 on the Sky platform. Virgin Media has also carried Eurosport 3D to broadcast the 2011 and 2012 French Open and 2012 Summer Olympics. UPC Ireland also broadcast Eurosport 3D for the 2011 French Open. Throughout the duration of the 2012 Summer Olympics, Eurosport 3D also broadcast on the Sky 3D channel.

On 13 November 2015 British Eurosport was replaced by localised versions of Eurosport 1 & Eurosport 1 HD.

Eurosport 3D
In April 2010, Eurosport 3D launched but was only broadcast during a select number of events, such as the French Open and 2012 Summer Olympics.

Eurosport DK (2015–2016)
Eurosport DK was a Danish television channel owned by Discovery Networks Northern Europe. The channel replaced Canal 8 Sport and Eurosport 2 in Denmark on 1 July 2015.

On 28 May 2015, Discovery Networks Northern Europe announced that they would merge Canal 8 Sport and Eurosport 2 into Eurosport DK in Denmark, broadcasting football from Danish Superliga, the Bundesliga, Major League Soccer, Capital One Cup, UEFA Euro 2016 qualifying, tennis from ATP Tour, WTA Tour and 3 Grand Slams, cycling from UCI World Tour, Winter sport, Motorsports.

On 15 February 2016, the channel was replaced by Eurosport 2.

2018 Winter Olympics
Eurosport 3, Eurosport 4 and Eurosport 5 (and their HD equivalents) were additional channels created for the 2018 Winter Olympics broadcasting Olympic Broadcasting Services live and highlights streams for the duration of the Olympic Winter Games.

Eurosport News

A sports news channel was on air from 1 September 2000 to 4 January 2018, featuring live scores, highlights, breaking news and commentary. The service combined video, text and graphics with the screen divided into 4 parts: a video section displaying highlights and news bulletins, a breaking news ticker at the bottom and a scoring section for in-depth analysis of results and game stats.

Eurosport 2 Xtra (Portugal)

In 2016, Eurosport bought the rights for Formula One for Portugal and created a pay-TV channel for the occasion. It ended on the next year, after one season and the F1 went back to SportTV. The channel had more Motorsport competitions, such as Formula E, WTCC, and Dakar Rally.

Eurosport Australia
Eurosport Australia was a short-lived sports television channel available until 7 December 2020. It was available on Fetch TV until the contract between Eurosport and Fetch TV ended.

Programming
IAAF Diamond League Athletics
European Athletics Championships
FIBA EuroBasket
Milan-San Remo Cycling
Paris-Roubaix
Amstel Gold Race
ATP Tour 250
Liège–Bastogne–Liège
Giro d'Italia
Vuelta a España
PGiro di Lombardia
Presidents Cup
FIA World Endurance Championship
24 Hours of Le Mans

Viewing share Eurosport 1
Being an international channel, Eurosport's performance differs significantly between different countries. The figures below show Eurosport 1's share of overall viewing in some countries.

Sporting events

Eurosport provides viewers with European and international sporting events. It broadcasts different sporting events in each region. This includes several football competitions:
 AIFF Super Cup
 Frauen-Bundesliga (only for Austria, Germany, Liechtenstein, and Switzerland)
 FA Cup (only for Denmark and Sweden)
 FA Community Shield (only for Sweden)
 Coupe de France (only for France)
 Eliteserien
 Allsvenskan (only for Finland, Romania and Sweden)
 Superettan
 Major League Soccer (only for India)
 UEFA Nations League (only for Denmark)
 Africa Cup of Nations (only for Ireland, Portugal, Spain, and UK)
 Nepal T20 League

Other sports events include the Paris Dakar Rally, the Monte Carlo Rally, athletics events such as World Athletics Championships and the European Athletics Championships, cycling events such as the Tour de France, Giro d'Italia (except France) and the Vuelta a España, tennis events including the French Open, Australian Open, Wimbledon (31 European territories) and the US Open, the World Championship Snooker, National Hockey League (only for Russia), World Boxing Super Series (only for Spain), and action sports like skating and surfing.

In June 2015, it was announced that Eurosport had secured the pan-European rights (except Russia) to the winter and summer Olympic Games between 2018 and 2024.

In July 2017, Eurosport had secured the domestic and international rights from 2017 to 2020 of the Italian Lega Basket Serie A (LBA). Eurosport is the new owner of the pay TV, international and internet rights. Eurosport has TV rights also for Italian Basketball Supercup and Italian Basketball Cup.

In October 2018, Eurosport has reached an agreement with the World Boxing Super Series for the exclusive acquisition of the Competition's broadcast rights in Spain

In October 2018, Eurosport sealed a 3-year deal to show British Darts Organisation major events BDO World Darts Championship, World Masters (darts) & World Trophy

In January 2019, it was announced that Eurosport will screen 39 ATP tennis tournaments including the tour finals in Russia for 3 years.

Motorsport
Eurosport Events (formerly known as 'KSO Kigema Sports Organisation Ltd') is the Eurosport group's sporting events management/promotion/production division, which promotes the FIA World Touring Car Cup (WTCR) and the FIA European Rally Championship.

Eurosport Events was also the promoter of the Intercontinental Rally Challenge, a rival rallying series to the World Rally Championship, and of the FIA European Touring Car Cup. The IRC ceased at the end of the 2012 season, with Eurosport taking over series promotion of the ERC from 2013. The European Touring Car Cup was active until 2017.

Since 2008, the Eurosport Group has also been broadcasting the annual 24 Hours of Le Mans in full.

Eurosport airs MotoGP in India, previously it had broadcasting rights in various territories including the Netherlands, Belgium, Romania, France and Germany. The network also airs Superbike World Championship in multiple European countries.

On 29 September 2015, Eurosport acquired the Portuguese broadcasting rights for Formula One between 2016 and 2018.

On 30 September, Eurosport and FIM announced that they had signed a contract regarding partnership for FIM's international speedway championships where Eurosport will be the promotor for 10 years. They also announced a deal to show SGB Premiership matches live throughout the season.

Eurosport airs Formula E across Western and Central Europe, except in Germany and Italy.

Football

Tennis
- from 2020 qualifiers

Basketball

See also
 Broadcasting of sports events
 Fight Club
 Sports channel
Eurosport (Indian TV channel)

Footnotes

References

External links

 

 
Television channels and stations established in 1989
Multilingual broadcasters
Sports television channels in the United Kingdom
Television stations in Germany
Television channels in the Netherlands
Television channels in Flanders
Television channels in Belgium
Pan-European media companies
Sports mass media in Italy
Television channels in Italy
Olympics on television
Sports television in Malaysia
Sports television in Singapore
Sports television in Indonesia
Television stations in Denmark
Pay television
Warner Bros. Discovery networks
Sports television in Russia
Mass media in the European Union
1989 establishments in Europe
Warner Bros. Discovery EMEA